Have Gun – Will Travel is an American radio and television series.

Have Gun – Will Travel may also refer to:

 Have Gun, Will Travel (band), an American alternative and folk rock band
 Have Gun Will Travel, a 1998 book about Death Row Records by Ronin Ro